Silvia del Rincon (born 3 April 1971) is a Spanish former alpine skier who competed in the 1992 Winter Olympics.

References

1971 births
Living people
Spanish female alpine skiers
Olympic alpine skiers of Spain
Alpine skiers at the 1992 Winter Olympics